Generoso is the given name of:

Generoso Jiménez (1917-2007), Cuban trombone player
Generoso Pope (1891–1950), Italian-American businessman and newspaper publisher
Generoso Pope, Jr. (1927-1998), American newspaper publisher best known for creating The National Enquirer, son of the above
Generoso Rossi (born 1979), Italian footballer
General Generoso Senga, former Chief of Staff of the Armed Forces of the Philippines - see List of AFP Chiefs of Staff